Somebody Somewhere is an American comedy drama television series starring Bridget Everett and created by Hannah Bos and Paul Thureen. It premiered on HBO on January 16, 2022. In February 2022, the series was renewed for a second season, which is set to premiere on April 23, 2023.

Premise
Set in Manhattan, Kansas, the series follows Sam as she deals with a midlife crisis after the death of her sister.

Cast and characters
 Bridget Everett as Sam, a woman in her 40s trying to find happiness
 Jeff Hiller as Joel, Sam's co-worker and friend
 Mary Catherine Garrison as Tricia Miller, Sam's sister who runs a store called Tender Moments
 Danny McCarthy as Rick, Tricia's husband
 Mike Hagerty as Ed Miller (season 1), Sam's father and a farmer
 Murray Hill as Fred Rococo, a soil scientist and a master of ceremonies
 Jane Drake Brody as Mary Jo, Sam's mother struggling with alcoholism
 Jon Hudson Odom as Michael, Joel's boyfriend
 Heidi Johanningmeier as Charity, co-owner of Tender Moments

Development and production
In July 2020, HBO ordered Somebody Somewhere to series which is inspired by the life of Bridget Everett who plays the lead role and is also an executive producer. In June 2021, the cast was announced, which included Jeff Hiller, Mary Catherine Garrison, Danny McCarthy, Mike Hagerty (in his final acting role before his death in May 2022), Murray Hill, Jon Hudson Odom, and Heidi Johanningmeier. In February 2022, HBO renewed the series for a second season.

The series was filmed in suburban Chicago, primarily in Lockport and Warrenville. The creators chose Chicago as a filming location because of the talent pool available; Hannah Bos said, "We cast a lot of roles out of Chicago, and the talent pool was insane. It was exciting to have so many choices for so many roles. I'm biased because I love the Chicago style of acting — which I feel is very grounded, very real, very nuanced — and we had many wonderful actors to draw on to fill our world in."

Episodes

Season 1 (2022)

Season 2

Reception

Critical response
On Rotten Tomatoes, the first season holds a 100% approval rating based on 28 reviews, with an average rating of 8.6/10. The site's critical consensus reads, "Led by a captivating Bridget Everett, Somebody Somewhere explores the human condition with tenderness, grace, and warmth. On Metacritic, the first season has a score of 86 out of 100, based on 12 reviews, indicating "universal acclaim."

Accolades

References

External links
 
 

2022 American television series debuts
2020s American comedy-drama television series
2020s American LGBT-related drama television series
English-language television shows
HBO original programming
Television series by Duplass Brothers Productions
Television series by Home Box Office
Television shows filmed in Illinois
Television shows set in Kansas